Qorban Lak (also Romanized as Qorbān Lak) is a village in Band-e Amir Rural District, Zarqan District, Shiraz County, Fars Province, Iran. At the 2006 census, its population was 750, in 188 families.

References 

Populated places in Zarqan County